Alex Neal-Bullen (born 9 January 1996) is a professional Australian rules footballer playing for the Melbourne Football Club in the Australian Football League (AFL). He played top-level football early when he played senior football for the Glenelg Football Club in the South Australian National Football League (SANFL) at eighteen years of age, in addition to representing South Australia at the 2014 AFL Under 18 Championships. He was recruited by the Melbourne Football Club with the fortieth selection in the 2014 AFL draft and he made his AFL debut during the 2015 season.

Early life
Neal-Bullen was born into a sporting family, where his grandma, Cheryl Neal, became the first female jockey in history to win a race in Melbourne against men, achieved in 1979. Her career ended prematurely after a fall which left her in a coma for eight months and paraplegic from the waist down; his grandmother's disability was one of the reasons behind Neal-Bullen deciding to study education and disability at Flinders University during 2014.

Neal-Bullen played his junior career with the Glenelg Football Club and played nine senior games with the South Australian National Football League (SANFL) senior team in 2014. He attended Sacred Heart College in Adelaide. He achieved state selection for South Australia in the 2014 AFL Under 18 Championships and played in the winning grand final against Vic Metro, whilst also being named in the best players for the match. His performances in the championships, where he was the leading clearance winner, and his performances in the SANFL led to him being regarded as an in-and-under player who made an impact on games. In addition, his athletic background placed him in the elite bracket of endurance runners and raised his prospects to being drafted inside the top twenty-five.

AFL career

Neal-Bullen was recruited by the Melbourne Football Club with their third selection and the fortieth overall in the 2014 national draft. After a delayed start to the 2015 season through knee injuries, he made his debut in round eleven against  at Etihad Stadium. He kicked his first goal the following week in the twenty-four point victory against  at Simonds Stadium and finished the match with three goals. After his debut, he missed only one match for the remainder of the season and managed eleven games overall with a total of six goals; furthermore, Melbourne football operations manager, Josh Mahoney, noted Neal-Bullen had "adapted really quickly to the demands of being an AFL player" which saw him extend his contract until the end of 2017, despite being in contract for the 2016 season.

The 2016 season saw Neal-Bullen spend the majority of the season playing in the Victorian Football League (VFL) for Melbourne's affiliate team, the Casey Scorpions. He maintained his spot the next week for the match against , before being omitted for the round eleven match against  at the Melbourne Cricket Ground. He was recalled to the senior side for the six point loss against  at Subiaco Oval in round eighteen and was dropped the next week before playing his final match of the season in the twenty-point loss against  at the Melbourne Cricket Ground in round twenty-two, managing just four matches in his second year. Despite failing to maintain a spot in the senior side, he had strong form in the VFL, which saw him play in seventeen matches, and he was named in the best players twelve times. His performances saw him finish as the runner-up in Casey's best and fairest count, behind captain and former  player, Jack Hutchins, and a fifth-place finish in the J. J. Liston Trophy – awarded to the best and fairest player in the VFL – with thirteen votes.

Statistics
Updated to the end of the 2022 season.

|-
| 2015 ||  || 30
| 11 || 6 || 4 || 60 || 44 || 104 || 20 || 26 || 0.5 || 0.4 || 5.5 || 4.0 || 9.5 || 1.8 || 2.4 || 0
|-
| 2016 ||  || 30
| 4 || 2 || 0 || 19 || 37 || 56 || 9 || 11 || 0.5 || 0.0 || 4.8 || 9.3 || 14.0 || 2.3 || 2.8 || 0
|-
| 2017 ||  || 30
| 19 || 15 || 9 || 204 || 155 || 359 || 61 || 87 || 0.8 || 0.5 || 10.7 || 8.2 || 18.9 || 3.2 || 4.6 || 0
|-
| 2018 ||  || 30
| 25 || 27 || 19 || 246 || 176 || 422 || 78 || 118 || 1.1 || 0.8 || 9.8 || 7.0 || 16.9 || 3.1 || 4.7 || 3
|-
| 2019 ||  || 30
| 14 || 7 || 9 || 108 || 76 || 184 || 36 || 59 || 0.5 || 0.6 || 7.7 || 5.4 || 13.1 || 2.6 || 4.2 || 0
|-
| 2020 ||  || 30
| 7 || 7 || 0 || 36 || 27 || 63 || 14 || 16 || 1.0 || 0.0 || 5.1 || 3.9 || 9.0 || 2.0 || 2.3 || 0
|-
| scope=row bgcolor=F0E68C | 2021# ||  || 30
| 25 || 15 || 11 || 255 || 153 || 408 || 80 || 111 || 0.6 || 0.4 || 10.2 || 6.1 || 16.3 || 3.2 || 4.4 || 0
|-
| 2022 ||  || 30
| 23 || 9 || 17 || 184 || 175 || 359 || 71 || 105 || 0.4 || 0.7 || 8.0 || 7.6 || 15.6 || 3.1 || 4.6 || 0
|- class=sortbottom
! colspan=3 | Career
! 128 !! 88 !! 69 !! 1112 !! 843 !! 1955 !! 369 !! 533 !! 0.7 !! 0.5 !! 8.7 !! 6.6 !! 15.3 !! 2.9 !! 4.2 !! 3
|}

Notes

Honours and achievements
Team
 AFL premiership player: 2021
 McClelland Trophy: 2021

References

External links

Alex Neal-Bullen profile from Demonwiki

1996 births
Living people
Melbourne Football Club players
Casey Demons players
Glenelg Football Club players
Australian rules footballers from South Australia
People educated at Sacred Heart College, Adelaide
Melbourne Football Club Premiership players
One-time VFL/AFL Premiership players